is a pedestrian shopping street lined with fashion boutiques, cafes and restaurants in Harajuku in Tokyo, Japan. Stores on Takeshita Street include major chains such as The Body Shop, McDonald's, and 7-Eleven, but most of the businesses are small independent shops that carry an array of styles. The shops on this street are often a bellwether for broader fads, and some are known as "antenna shops," which manufacturers seed with prototypes for test-marketing.

Located directly across from the exit of JR East's Harajuku Station, Takeshita Street is very popular with young teenagers, particularly those visiting Tokyo on school trips, or local young people shopping for small "cute" goods at weekends.

History 

Takeshita Street was a reliable place to go and purchase fake Japanese and American street brand goods from the early 1990s to 2004. Since 2004, a stronger metropolitan government stance on counterfeit merchandise has led to a decrease of such items being available to the public.

2019 New Year's Day vehicle attack

During the early morning of January 1, 2019, a 21-year-old man named Kazuhiro Kusakabe drove his minicar into the crowd of pedestrians celebrating New Year's Day on Takeshita Street. The man claimed his actions were a terrorist attack, and later stated that his intention was to retaliate against the usage of the death penalty. The man attempted to flee from the scene but was soon apprehended by authorities in a nearby park. It is believed that the attack has some connection to the execution of Shoko Asahara leader of the Aum Shinrikyo doomsday cult in July 2018.

References

Harajuku
Pedestrian malls
Shibuya
Streets in Tokyo